The Capture of Hooly Honore, a town and fortress held by forces of the Kingdom of Mysore, occurred on 21 December 1791, after two days of siege by combined forces of the British East India Company and the Maratha Empire.  The battle was part of a campaign during the Third Anglo-Mysore War by Maratha leader Purseram Bhow to recover Maratha territories taken by Hyder Ali in an earlier conflict between Mysore and the Marathas.

References
Moor, Edward (1794). A narrative of the operations of captain Little's detachment, and of the Mahratta army (a detailed British account of the capture)
Mill, James. A history of British India, Volume 5
Duff, James Grant. A history of the Mahrattas, Volume 2

Hooly Honore
Hooly Honore 1791
Hooly Honore 1791
Hooly Honore 1791
Hooly Honore 1791
Military history of India
1791 in India